Five ships of the United States Navy have been named Decatur, in honor of Commodore Stephen Decatur.

 , was a sloop-of-war built in 1839 and in service from 1840 to 1859.
 , is an  commissioned in 1998 and currently in active service.

United States Navy ship names